Katherine Mary Govier (born July 4, 1948) is a Canadian novelist and essayist.

Biography
Katherine Govier was born in Edmonton, Alberta, and was educated at the University of Alberta and York University. She has been made a Distinguished Alumna of the University of Alberta and is one of York University's "Famous Fifty" graduates. She has been Chair of the Writers' Trust of Canada and President of PEN Canada.  Govier has published essays in major newspapers and magazines, including Maclean's, Saturday Night, The Globe and Mail, Harper's, Queen, and The Toronto Star.

Govier was shortlisted for the Trillium Award in 1994, and won the City of Toronto Book Award in 1992.  In 1997, she was awarded the Marian Engel Award for a woman writer in mid-career.   Her novel "Creation" was a New York Times Notable Book of 2003.  Her 2010 novel, The Ghost Brush, focusing on the life of Katsushika Oi, has been published in translation in French as La Femme Hokusai, in Japanese as Hokusai Tu Oi, in Spanish as La Hija del Dibujante, in Romanian as Fiica Lui Hokusai, and in the United States under the title The Printmaker's Daughter.  In 2014, Lori Saint-Martin and Paul Gagne were nominated for the Governor General's award for translation 2014 for their translation of The Ghost Brush into French as La Femme Hokusai, published by Quebec-Amerique.

In 2011, she wrote an article for the Ottawa Citizen about a New York Times article on the disparity of female to male writers who contribute to the writing and editing of Wikipedia.  Govier also founded The Shoe Project, a writing workshop for immigrant women, with sponsorship from Heather Gardiner and hosting by The Bata Shoe Museum. The group publishes stories on the web, creates 'snapshot' exhibits for The Bata Shoe Museum, and offers public performances.  It has been the subject of two one-hour documentaries on CBC Ideas, In Their Shoes I (February 27, 2012), and In Their Shoes II (June 10, 2013), and a Toronto Star article.

In April 2014, Govier's anthology Half for You and Half For Me: Nursery Rhymes and the Stories Behind Them, with illustrations by Sarah Clement, was published by Whitecap Publishers.

Personal life
Govier lives in Toronto, Ontario with her partner Nicholas Rundall. She has two children, Robin and Emily Honderich.  She was previously married to John Honderich, former publisher of the Toronto Star.

Bibliography

Novels
Random Descent - 1979
Going Through the Motions - 1982
Between Men - 1987 
Hearts of Flame - 1991
Angel Walk - 1996 
The Truth Teller - 2000
Creation - 2002
Three Views of Crystal Water - 2005
The Ghost Brush - 2010 
The Three Sisters Bar and Hotel - 2016

Short story collections
Fables of Brunswick Avenue - 1985
Before and After - 1989
The Immaculate Conception Photo Gallery - 1994

Anthologies edited
Without a Guide: Contemporary Women's Travel Adventures - 1994
Solo: Writers on Pilgrimage - 2004
HALF FOR YOU AND HALF FOR ME Nursery Rhymes and the Stories Behind Them - April 2014, anthology, illustrations by Sarah Clement, published by Whitecap Publishers.

References

External links 
 Katherine Govier website
 HarperCollins Canada site
 Author Video - Discussing Three Views of Crystal Water

1948 births
Living people
Members of the Order of Canada
University of Alberta alumni
York University alumni
Canadian women novelists
Writers from Edmonton
Writers from Toronto
Canadian women short story writers
20th-century Canadian novelists
21st-century Canadian novelists
20th-century Canadian women writers
21st-century Canadian women writers
20th-century Canadian short story writers
21st-century Canadian short story writers